Felix Okon Udoh (born 28 December 1993) is a Nigerian footballer who plays as a left back for Partizani Tirana in the Albanian Superliga.

References

1993 births
Living people
Nigerian footballers
Kategoria Superiore players
FK Partizani Tirana players
Nigerian expatriate footballers
Nigerian expatriate sportspeople in Albania
Expatriate footballers in Albania
Nigeria under-20 international footballers
Association football defenders